Maxwell Park is a neighborhood in Oakland, California located in the foothills of the city. It is geographically bordered by MacArthur Boulevard, High Street, Trask Street, Foothill Boulevard, and 55th Avenue and is adjacent to Mills College, I-580, Brookdale Park, and the Fairfax neighborhood. It lies at an elevation of from 138 feet to its highest point of 266 feet on Knowland Ave (42 m).

Many of the homes in the neighborhood have panoramic views of the Oakland Hills to the north, Alameda and the San Francisco Bay to the west.

History
The area is named after its developer,  John P. Maxwell.  The original development area was bounded by 55th Avenue, Trask Street, Monticello Avenue and Camden Street.

The land was opened zoned for development on May 7, 1921, and Burritt and Shealey, the main developers were the same developers from many of the homes in the nearby upscale enclave of Piedmont.

Nearby streetcar transportation and a salubrious climate were cardinal selling points.  It is in East Oakland's justly famed 'warm belt'.  The streetcars were eventually replaced by AC Transit buses in 1960. Line 47 provides community service in the neighborhood from 55th Avenue and Trask Street to the Fruitvale BART station; lines 57 and NL provide service near the neighborhood on MacArthur Boulevard.

Notable Places
Maxwell Park (a city park)
Fremont High School
Home of Peace Cemetery
Mills College
Melrose Leadership Academy
Urban Montessori Charter School
Courtland Creek

See also
Laurel, Oakland

References

External links

Neighborhoods in Oakland, California
Streetcar suburbs
Populated places established in 1921